Federal Route 1207, or Jalan FELDA Gedangsa, is a Federal Land Development Authority (FELDA) federal road in Selangor, Malaysia.

The Kilometre Zero is located at Jalan Sabak Bernam-Hulu Selangor.

At most sections, the Federal Route 1207 was built under the JKR R5 road standard, with a speed limit of 90 km/h.

List of junctions

Malaysian Federal Roads